This is the discography of rap group Dem Franchize Boyz. It consists of three studio albums and six singles.

The group released their debut album, Dem Franchize Boyz, in September 2004. It failed to reach success in the U.S., failing to enter the Top 100 of the Billboard 200. The albums lone single, "White Tee", reached #79 on the Billboard Hot 100.

It was their second album that saw mainstream success. In 2005 they released "I Think They Like Me", the first single off their second album, On Top of Our Game. The single became a Top 15 hit on the Hot 100, and was also a Number One single on the Hot R&B/Hip-Hop Songs as well as the Hot Rap Tracks chart. The single was also certified Gold by the Recording Industry Association of America. On Top of Our Game was released in February 2006, and charted within the Top 5 of the pop charts and debuted at #1 on the Top Rap Albums chart. "Lean wit It, Rock wit It", the album's second single, became their highest charting single on the Hot 100, where it reached a peak of #7. It was certified Platinum in the US, shortly after its chart run. A third and final single from the album, "Ridin' Rims", failed to chart in the Top 40.

Their third and final album, Our World, Our Way, was released in September 2008, and failed to match the success of its preceder. It failed to make the Top 100 of the Billboard 200, and no single released made the Hot 100. The group eventually went into hiatus in 2008, after being dropped from E1 Music.

Albums

Studio albums

Singles

As lead artist

As featured performer

References

.discography
Discographies of American artists
Hip hop discographies
Contemporary R&B discographies